The 1990–91 Eintracht Frankfurt season was the 91st season in the club's football history. In 1990–91 the club played in the Bundesliga, the top tier of German football. It was the club's 28th season in the Bundesliga.

Friendlies

Competitions

Bundesliga

League table

Results by round

Matches

DFB-Pokal

UEFA Cup

Squad

Squad and statistics

|}

Notes

References

Sources

External links
 Official English Eintracht website 
 German archive site
 1990–91 Bundesliga season at Fussballdaten.de 

1990-91
German football clubs 1990–91 season